Deep Chandra Sonkar is an Indian politician who belonged to Lokdal (LKD), he is also known as "Sarkar" in Purvanchal. He was two times member of legislative assembly represented Shahganj (Assembly constituency), he is a social worker in his constituency, nearby area and in purvanchal. He won Shahganj assembly constituency elections with total votes of 21956 in 1985.
In 1989, Sonkar joined Janata Dal and again won Shahganj assembly elections with total votes of 29707.He has also served as Labour Minister (UP) in 1989.

Early life and education 
Deep Chandra Sonkar was born into a farmer family in Jaunpur district. He secured his M.A and degree in Law from T.D College Jaunpur.

Post held

See also 
 Uttar Pradesh Legislative Assembly

References 

Uttar Pradesh politicians
People from Jaunpur district
1955 births
Living people